Tarantasca is a comune (municipality) in the Province of Cuneo in the Italian region Piedmont, located about  south of Turin and about  north of Cuneo.

Tarantasca borders the following municipalities: Busca, Centallo, Cuneo, and Villafalletto.

References

Cities and towns in Piedmont